Kaveripattinam is a former state assembly constituency in Krishnagiri district in Tamil Nadu.

Members of Legislative Assembly

Election results

2006

2001

1996

1991

1989

1984

1980

1977

1971

1967

References

External links
 

Former assembly constituencies of Tamil Nadu
Krishnagiri district